The Men's heptathlon event  at the 2007 European Athletics Indoor Championships was held on March 3–4.

Medalists

Results

References
Results

Combined events at the European Athletics Indoor Championships
Heptathlon